The Akwa Ibom State Ministry of Finance is the state government ministry, charged with the responsibility to plan, devise and implement the Akwa Ibom State policies on finance.

See also 
 Akwa Ibom State Ministry of Justice

References 

Government ministries of Akwa Ibom State